Stanley Creek may refer to:

Stanley Creek (Toccoa River tributary), a stream in Georgia
Stanley Creek (Missouri), a stream in Missouri